John Wheeler Bunton (22 February 1807 – 24 August 1879) was a Texas settler and signer of the Texas Declaration of Independence (1836), which declared independence from Mexico. He is also known as the great-great-uncle of Lyndon Johnson.

References

1807 births
1879 deaths
People of the Texas Revolution
People from Gallatin, Tennessee
People from Bastrop, Texas
People from Hays County, Texas
Signers of the Texas Declaration of Independence